Sir Drugo Barentyn (died 1415), sometimes spelled as "Drew", "Dru", "Barentine" or "Barrington", was an English goldsmith and politician who served twice as Lord Mayor of London.

Barentyn came from a family of Norman French extraction. His ancestors had been seigneurs of Rozel in western Normandy, before coming to England two generations before his birth.  He was appointed one of the Sheriffs of London in 1393, serving with Richard Whittington. He twice held the post of Lord Mayor of London, being elected the first time in 1398 and the second in 1408. His first term of office coincided with the conflict culminating in the overthrow of King Richard II by King Henry IV. At the beginning of the term, Barentyn was made to swear an oath on behalf of the city's citizens upholding the banishment of Henry Bolingbroke (the future Henry IV); later in his term, he was entrusted with discreetly transporting the deposed Richard II to the Tower of London.

Apart from his political positions, Barentyn was a successful goldsmith  and merchant. He held the position of court jeweler during the reigns of Richard II and Henry IV. In 1400, he was issued a letter of marque to avenge the loss of a cargo of French wine to pirates. He resided near Goldsmiths' Hall, which he rebuilt in 1407, and donated "faire lands" to the Goldsmiths' Company in 1415.

Barentyn died in 1415. He was buried in the church of St John Zachary.

References

English goldsmiths
14th-century lord mayors of London
15th-century lord mayors of London
14th-century births
1415 deaths
Year of birth unknown